Simpatico may refer to:

 Simpatico (Suzy Bogguss and Chet Atkins album)
 Simpático (Gábor Szabó album) an album by Gábor Szabó and Gary McFarland
 Simpático (The Brian Lynch/Eddie Palmieri Project album), an album by The Brian Lynch/Eddie Palmieri Project
 Simpatico (The Charlatans album), an album by The Charlatans (known in the US as The Charlatans UK) 
 Simpatico (Velocity Girl album) an album by Velocity Girl
 Simpatico (D-A-D album), an album by D-A-D (formally known as Disneyland After Dark) 
 Simpatico (The Vandermark 5 album), a 1999 album by free jazz band The Vandermark 5
 Simpatico (play), a 1993 play by Sam Shepard
 Simpatico (film), a 1999 feature film adapted from the 1993 play of same name

See also 

 Sympatico, the former name of Bell Canada's Internet service